Dido Ali is a Kenyan politician from the United Democratic Alliance. In the 2022 Kenyan general election, he was elected Member of Parliament for Saku.

References 

Living people
Year of birth missing (living people)
United Democratic Alliance (Kenya) politicians
21st-century Kenyan politicians
Members of the 13th Parliament of Kenya
People from Marsabit County